Holy Family, also called The Rest on the Flight into Egypt, is an oil on canvas painting by the French Rococo artist Antoine Watteau, now in the Hermitage Museum, Saint Petersburg. Variously dated between 1714 and 1721, Holy Family is possibly the rarest surviving religious subject in Watteau's art, related to either the Gospel of Matthew, or the Gospel of Pseudo-Matthew; it depicts the Virgin, the Christ Child, and Saint Joseph amid a landscape, surrounded by putti.

In the early 18th century, Holy Family belonged to Watteau's close friends, the royal councilor Nicolas Hénin and the manufacturer Jean de Jullienne; by the middle of that century, it entered the collection of Polish-Saxon statesman Heinrich, Count von Brühl. As part of the Brühl collection, the painting was acquired in 1769 for the Hermitage, then recently established by Empress Catherine II of Russia. Since the mid-19th century, it was present in the Tauride Palace, and later in the Gatchina Palace near Saint Petersburg; after the Russian Revolution, Holy Family entered the Hermitage again in 1920.

Exhibition history

References

Further reading

External links
 Holy Family at the Hermitage Museum official website
 The Holy Family at the Web Gallery of Art

Paintings by Antoine Watteau
Paintings in the collection of the Hermitage Museum
1710s paintings
Paintings of the Holy Family